Gabriel Abbo (26 June 1883 – 20 October 1954) was a French politician, born in Sidi Daoud, Algeria (then named Abbo).

From 1921 to 1924, Abbo represented a French Algerian constituency (Anciens départements d'Algérie) at the Chamber of Deputies for the Republican-Socialist Party.

References

1883 births
1954 deaths
People from Djinet
People from Bordj Menaïel District
People from Boumerdès Province
People of French Algeria
Pieds-Noirs
Republican-Socialist Party politicians
Members of the 12th Chamber of Deputies of the French Third Republic